Paul Mbatia Koinange  commonly known as Paul Koinange (2 March 1949 – 31 March 2021) was a Kenyan politician. He was a member of the Jubilee Party and was elected to represent the Kiambaa Constituency in the National Assembly of Kenya from 2013 till his death in 2021.

Paul died from COVID-19 complications in Nairobi aged 72.

References

1949 births
2021 deaths
Jubilee Party politicians
Members of the National Assembly (Kenya)
People from Kiambu County
Deaths from the COVID-19 pandemic in Kenya